Rakshasudu may refer to:
 Rakshasudu (1986 film), a Telugu-language action crime film
 Rakshasudu (2019 film), an Indian Telugu-language psychological thriller film